Charles Dickinson (born June 4, 1951) is an American writer known for his literary novels, which often mix realism with winsome absurdity. His debut novel, Waltz in Marathon, was published in 1983. He has written five other novels—the most recent, A Family in Time, was released as an e-book in 2012—and a collection of short stories.

His short fiction and non-fiction pieces have appeared in Atlantic Monthly, Esquire, The New Yorker, and a variety of literary magazines.

A Shortcut in Time
"Readers of all persuasions will welcome the quiet metaphysics of A Shortcut in Time. With its precise cadences and poetic observations, Charles Dickinson's novel is like a wondrous old pendulum clock you acquired from an antiques dealer after discovering to your delight that it still kept perfect time."—James Morrow

The Widows' Adventures
Widows Ina and Helene, sisters from Chicago, set off on a drive to Los Angeles. There's one problem: Only Helene can drive, and she's blind. Beer-swigging Ina acts as her eyes. On back roads in the dead of night they travel across an America they never knew.

Crows
Robert has moved into the home of his biology teacher, Ben Ladysmith. That Ben has been missing for two years is just one of the mysteries enriching this brilliant novel. Robert annoys, infuriates and loves Ben's family—and helps them find a way through their grief.

Bibliography

Novels
 Waltz in Marathon (Knopf, 1983)
 Crows (Knopf, 1985)
 The Widows' Adventures (Morrow, 1989)
 Rumor Has It (Morrow, 1991)
 A Shortcut in Time (Forge, 2003)
 A Family in Time (self-published e-book, 2012)

Story collections
 With or Without and Other Stories (Knopf, 1987)

HarperCollins has reissued his first four novels and the story collection as e-books.

1951 births
Writers from Chicago
Living people
20th-century American novelists
21st-century American novelists
Place of birth missing (living people)
American male novelists
American male essayists
American male short story writers
20th-century American short story writers
21st-century American short story writers
20th-century American essayists
21st-century American essayists
Novelists from Illinois
Writers from Detroit
20th-century American male writers
21st-century American male writers
Novelists from Michigan